Skin (Angelo Espinosa)  is a fictional character (a human mutant) appearing in American comic books published by Marvel Comics. The character first appeared in The Uncanny X-Men #317 (October 1994).

Fictional character biography
Angelo Espinosa was a former gang member from the east Los Angeles area who faked his own death to leave that part of his life behind. Skin was one of four young mutants (including M, Husk, and Blink) abducted by the Phalanx, a techno-organic alien race. The reason behind the abductions was so that the Phalanx could uncover the secret behind their inability to assimilate mutants into their collective. Through their combined efforts and those of Banshee, Emma Frost, Sabretooth, Synch, and Jubilee, the four young mutants managed to escape their confines; although, Blink sacrificed herself by using her powers to destroy the Phalanx that had captured them.

Afterwards, Skin accepted an invitation to enroll in the Massachusetts Academy, a school for mutants owned by Emma Frost. As a member of Generation X, Skin was joined by Synch, Jubilee, Husk, and M (and later by Chamber, Penance, and Mondo). During his stay at the Massachusetts Academy, Skin became close friends with Chamber because neither could pass for normal humans in public, and he always found time to playfully flirt with Husk, Jubilee (whom he nicknamed Jubecita), and M. Skin was also hunted by a mutant-killing vigilante known as the X-Cutioner who believed Skin responsible for the death of Angelo Espinosa. The X-Cutioner did not know that Skin, in fact, was Angelo Espinosa. Skin and Chamber succeeded in defeating the vigilante, but kept the secret.

During Operation: Zero Tolerance, Skin and his teammates found themselves transported to his hometown by Glorian. While searching for Skin's cousin Gil, they were captured by Skin's ex-girlfriend Tores, a gang leader who wanted to kill him for making her believe he was dead. Before she got the chance, Prime Sentinels attacked both Generation X and her gang, forcing them into a reluctant temporary truce. Skin and Tores acted as bait to lead the Sentinels into an ambush, and Gil completed the trap by starting a huge explosion, allowing Generation X to escape.

After the Academy closed due to the machinations of Adrienne Frost, Skin returned to Los Angeles with Jubilee in tow. Some time later, Skin and Jubilee, along with Magma, Bedlam, and a handful of other unknown mutants were found crucified on the lawn of the X-Mansion. This action was done by the Church of Humanity, a militant, religious anti-mutant organization. Archangel used his blood's healing properties to revive Jubilee and Magma but Bedlam and Skin didn't survive.

Jubilee, Husk, and Archangel went to visit Skin's grave after Jubilee had recovered only to find that the owner of the cemetery was about to dig Angelo up and remove him because of his status as a mutant. The girls argued with the foreman, but he insisted that it was against the religious convictions of the cemetery to bury mutants. He offered to cremate Angelo's remains and give them to the girls, which he ultimately did.

Skin was later resurrected by means of the Transmode Virus to serve as part of Selene's army of deceased mutants. Under the control of Selene and Eli Bard, he takes part in the assault on the mutant nation of Utopia.

Years later, Skin was resurrected on Krakoa through The Five, his resurrection pushed forward on the schedule because his former teammate Synch was needed to act as a back-up for The Five and they believed the two young mutants would help each over re-adjust. He was seen arm in arm with Synch and standing next to Broo at a party following the first meeting of the Quiet Council. He was later approached by Madison Jeffries manifesting himself through the land, who explained to him that he was thrown in the Pit of Exile for trying to create a place for Danger to live, which was deemed a violation of rule three by the Quiet Council. He later told Blob about this, unsure if it really happened, Blob assures him he's seen enough weird things to believe his story and remarks there's going to be a power-vacuum soon and that "it's good to have a brotherhood.

Powers and abilities
Skin possessed approximately six feet of extra skin. He was capable of stretching, deforming, wrapping, expanding, and compressing this extra amount of epidermis. When Skin is performing any of these stunts, it is only the epidermis that was manipulated; Skin's skeletal structure was the same as any normal, average person of his age and height. Skin's skin had a greyish tone and, because of the extra amount, gave him the appearance of a melted candle. At one point, along with compressing his skin tighter against his body, Skin was learning to manipulate the pigment melanin in his epidermis in order to appear normal. However, performing these two stunts together caused him to have migraines and he soon gave up on the idea of being normal.

Other versions

Age of Apocalypse
In the alternate timeline of the Age of Apocalypse, Skin was featured in Generation Next as one of the protégés tapped by Colossus and Shadowcat to rescue Illyana Rasputin from enslavement at the Sugar Man's Core. Due to their more militant training, Skin was depicted as using his powers in a much more aggressive fashion, including impaling opponents with skin protrusions. Colossus abandoned the team to ensure Illyana's rescue, and as a result, only he, Shadowcat, and Illyana managed to escape from the Core. Skin and the rest of his teammates were overwhelmed and killed by the Core's guards.

Ultimate Marvel
In the Ultimate Marvel universe it was mentioned by Sunspot that Skin had nearly been beaten to death by humans.

In other media

Film
 Skin was portrayed by Augustin Rodriguez in the 1996 made-for-TV movie Generation X. In the film his powers were closer to true elasticity, similar to the powers of Mister Fantastic. However, it caused him pain to use this power.
 In the film X2 his name appears on a list of names Mystique scrolls through on Stryker's computer while looking for Magneto's file.

References

External links
Skin at the Marvel Universe
Skin at UncannyXmen.net

Characters created by Joe Madureira
Characters created by Scott Lobdell
Comics characters introduced in 1994
Puerto Rican superheroes
Fictional characters from Los Angeles
Fictional characters who can stretch themselves
Marvel Comics characters who are shapeshifters
Marvel Comics mutants
Marvel Comics male superheroes